Eryxia confusa is a species of leaf beetle reported from the Republic of the Congo and the Democratic Republic of the Congo. It was first described from Garamba National Park by Brian J. Selman in 1972. Its host plants include Canthium sp.

References 

Eumolpinae
Beetles of Africa
Insects of the Republic of the Congo
Beetles of the Democratic Republic of the Congo
Beetles described in 1972